The 2017–18 Lehigh Mountain Hawks men's basketball team represented Lehigh University during the 2017–18 NCAA Division I men's basketball season. The Mountain Hawks, led by 11th-year head coach Brett Reed, played their home games at Stabler Arena in Bethlehem, Pennsylvania as members of the Patriot League. They finished the season 16–14, 11–7 in Patriot League play to finish in a tie for third place. They lost in the quarterfinals of the Patriot League tournament to Boston University.

Previous season
The Mountain Hawks finished the 2016–17 season 20–12, 12–6 in Patriot League play to finish in a tie for second place. As the No. 3 seed in the Patriot League tournament, they defeated Colgate and Boston University before losing to Bucknell in the championship game. Despite having 20 wins, they did not participate in a postseason tournament.

Offseason

2017 recruiting class

Roster

Schedule and results

|-
!colspan=9 style=| Non-conference regular season

|-
!colspan=9 style=| Patriot League regular season

|-
!colspan=9 style=| Patriot League tournament

References

Lehigh Mountain Hawks men's basketball seasons
Lehigh
Lehigh
Lehigh